Cantabria (A15) is a Combat Supply Ship operated by the Spanish Navy. Acquired to provide logistical support for the Spanish fleet, Cantabria was commissioned in 2010. Cantabria is the second-largest naval ship currently operated by the Spanish, behind .

Design and construction
Cantabria is a replenishment oiler, referred to in Spanish as a Buque de Aprovisionamiento en Combate (BAC; Supply Ship in Combat). She was acquired to provide logistical support to the Spanish Navy during day-to-day operations, expeditionary forces or strategic projection deployments, and for humanitarian and disaster relief operations. Propulsion is provided by two diesel engines, supplying  to a single propeller shaft, which is fitted with a controllable-pitch propeller. The ship's complement is 122.

The ship's capacity includes  of ship fuel,  of JP-5 jet fuel,  of fresh water, 280 tons of ammunition, and 470 tons of general cargo. The fuel storage areas are double-hulled. Cantabria can replenish three ships simultaneously; one on each side, plus a third via a stern refueling station. She can carry three Agusta-Bell AB.212, two Sikorsky SH-3 Sea King, or two NHIndustries NH90 helicopters to perform vertical replenishment.

Cantabria was laid down in the dry dock of shipyard of Puerto Real, Cadiz, on 18 July 2007; the first ship to be built there in 30 years. The ship was launched by floating on 21 July 2008, and was sponsored by Aurora Diaz Abella, the wife of Miguel Ángel Revilla, the President of the Autonomous Community of Cantabria. The ship underwent sea trials in the Bay of Cadiz from October to December 2009. She was commissioned into the Spanish Navy on 29 September 2010. The original budget was €213m but the final cost was €238m.

Export

The design has been evaluated by foreign buyers. The Norwegian Navy has also expressed interest, but they have announced an order for a replenishment ship from South Korean shipbuilder DSME.

Australia considered the design for their replacement tankers, with Navantia competing against the Aegir variant of the  built by South Korea's DSME in a restricted tender competition.
Navantia's proposal based on Cantabria was announced as the successful design in the Australian tender in March 2016, with an expected in service date for the first of two vessels to be known as HMA Ships Supply and Stalwart of late 2019. The two vessels will be known within the Royal Australian Navy as the Supply class.

Operational history

On 3 July 2012, the Australian and Spanish governments signed an agreement to deploy Cantabria in support of the Royal Australian Navy during 2013. The ship operated in Australian waters from February to November 2013, was used to provide replenishment support to the Australians while the oiler  underwent maintenance. The deployment also allowed over 300 Australian personnel to train on systems similar to those in the Spanish-designed  and -class ships being acquired, and allowed the Royal Australian Navy to evaluate the design as a possible replacement for its replenishment vessels.

In 2015 the Canadian and Spanish governments concluded a deal where  and Cantabria would deploy with Canadian naval forces as their replenishment vessel in 2016. This would be done primarily for training missions. Cantabria would be made available to the Royal Canadian Navy from mid-September to November 2016.

References

Ships of the Spanish Navy
Ships built in Spain
2008 ships
Auxiliary replenishment ship classes